Motarjem is a quarterly magazine published in Mashhad, Iran, dedicated to translation. The magazine was launched in 1991. It was founded by Ali Khazaee Farid who also publishes it privately. Its contributors include Karim Emami, Abdollah Kowsari, Goli Emami among others.

References

External links
 Official website of the Motarjem journal
 The Motarjem journal's page in the Magiran (the Iranian magazine database)

1991 establishments in Iran
Literary magazines published in Iran
Literary translation magazines
Magazines established in 1991
Mass media in Mashhad
Persian-language magazines
Quarterly magazines